Maria da Conceição can refer to:
Maria da Conceição de Manso Saião, one of first Ladies and Gentlemen of Brazil 1919–1922
Maria da Conceição Tavares (born 1930), Brazilian economist
Maria da Conceição, Brazilian high jumper, winner of 1963 South American Championships in Athletics, 1965 South American Championships in Athletics, 1967 South American Championships in Athletics, 1969 South American Championships in Athletics and 1971 South American Championships in Athletics
Maria da Conceição Nobre Cabral, foreign minister of Guinea-Bissau in 2007–2009
Maria da Conceição Gomes de Moura, Brazilian actress in 2011 film Swirl (film)
 Maria da Conceição (d. 1798), alleged Brazilian witch

See also 
Conceição Lima (born 1961 as Maria da Conceição de Deus Lima), Santomean poet
Leonor Maia (born 1921, pseudonym Maria da Conceição de Vasconcelos), Portuguese actress
Mãe Menininha do Gantois (1894–1986, born Maria da Conceição Assunção), Brazilian spiritual leader
Maria Ceiça (born 1965 as Maria da Conceição Justino de Paula), Brazilian actress and singer
Maria O'Neill (1873–1932, born Maria da Conceição de Eça O'Neill), Portuguese writer
Maria Ramos (born 1959 as Maria da Conceição), Portuguese-South African businesswoman